The pictorella mannikin, pictorella munia, or pictorella finch (Heteromunia pectoralis) is small brown and grey finch with a grey bill and distinctive scaly white breast plate which is endemic to northern Australia. It is a seed-eater found in pairs and small flocks in dry savannah and subtropical or tropical dry lowland grassland.

Description 
The pictorella mannikin is a grey-billed, buff-brown and grey finch with a distinctive white scaly breast and black face disc. Small white tips on its wing coverts "impart a jewel-like appearance". The bird has a maximum size of 120mm, with a wingspan of 56-63mm, a bill of 12-14mm and weighs between 13 to 15 grams.

Taxonomy and systematics

Scientific name 
The species was originally named Amadina pectoralis Gould, J. 1841 although later converted to Heteromunia pectoralis Mathews, 1913. It belongs to the monotypic genus Heteromunia and the family Estrildidae.

Holotypes held in the Academy of Natural Sciences of Drexel University, Philadelphia are Lectotype ANSP 14546, an adult a male from the north-west coast of Australia and Paralectotype ANSP 14547, an adult female from the north-west coast of Australia. Full classification is listed by the Atlas of Living Australia.

The genus name, Heteromunia infers "different from munia" from the Greek heteros meaning different and the common name munia. Munia is a common name used in Asia for many finches, perhaps derived from a Hindi word for seed eating birds.

Pectoralis derives from the Latin pectoris for the breast but also evoking the Old French word pectorale meaning breastplate which reflects the white scalloped bib on this bird.

Common name 
The common name used in Australia is pictorella mannikin. Gould used the name white-breasted finch in his Birds of Australia (1848) and it was the common name until 1926 when the Royal Australasian Ornithologists Union (RAOU) Official checklist declared the common name to be pectorella mannikin with no explanation.

The name mannikin is from the Dutch manneken, a diminutive of man. There is no clarity as to why this has been applied to birds in general and particularly to grass eating finches. In 1978 the RAOU checklist committee recommended using "mannikin" for the Australian Lonchura species.

Behaviour and ecology 
Pictorella mannikins forage on the ground in small flocks or pairs on seeding native grasses and sometimes take small invertebrates. Flocks aggregate around inland water sources particularly at the end of the dry season but disperse away from permanent water when rain falls. In northern Australia they often forage on recently burnt ground, open grassy woodland and fringes of wetland.

They are relatively short tailed with an upright stance. Pictorella mannikin pairs mate for life and lay 4 to 6 white or bluish white eggs in a dome-shaped grass nest in long grass or low bush.

In 2016 the pictorella mannikin's conservation status was listed Least Concern (LC) on the IUCN Red List although the population is marked as decreasing. In 2007, the International Union for Conservation of Nature downgraded its assessment of the species from Near Threatened (NT) to Least Concern (LC) after large flocks of this species were found at several locations.  In the Northern Territory and Western Australia the bird's conservation status is listed as Near Threatened (NT) while in Queensland the conservation status listing is Least Concern (LC).

Gallery

References 

pictorella mannikin
Birds of Western Australia
Birds of the Northern Territory
Birds of Queensland
Endemic birds of Australia
pictorella mannikin
pictorella mannikin
Taxonomy articles created by Polbot